Alana Massey (born June 12, 1985) is an American writer. She is the author of All the Lives I Want: Essays About My Best Friends Who Happen to Be Famous Strangers and has contributed to The Guardian, Elle, BuzzFeed, New York Magazine, Vice, Nylon, and Pacific Standard among other publications.

Her work covers online harassment, body dysmorphia, dating, mental health, and sex work. She attributes her first successes to the feminized "pink ghetto" of the "First-Person Industrial Complex" similarly to essayist Emily Gould, but her tone has since developed into more journalistic reporting and commentary.

On February 7, 2017, Grand Central Publishing released All the Lives I Want. In the memoir, Massey "continues to tell stories of herself ... through analysis of celebrity women" including Fiona Apple, Dolly Parton, Lana Del Rey, and Britney Spears.

References 

1985 births
Living people
21st-century American writers
21st-century American women writers